Matiur Rahman or Motiur Rahman is a male Muslim name composed of the elements Muti' , al- and Rahman meaning obedient to the Most Gracious. It may refer to:

Matiur Rahman (military pilot) (1942–1971), Bengali military pilot, killed during the Bangladesh Liberation War in 1971
Motiur Rahman (Bangladeshi politician) (born 1942), Bangladesh Awami League politician, Minister of Religious Affairs (2014–2018)
Motiur Rahman Nizami (1943–2016), Bangladeshi politician
Matiur Rahman (journalist) (born 1946), Bangladeshi newspaper editor
Mohammad Matiur Rahman (1947–2012), Bangladeshi politician and cardiac surgeon
Motiur Rahman Mollik (1950–2010), Bangladeshi poet
Matiur Rahman Mallik (died 1969), Bangladeshi student killed on Mass Upsurge Day
Matiur Rehman (born 1977), Pakistani militant, suspected to be an al Qaeda leader
Mati-ur-Rehman (born 1984), Pakistani weightlifter
Motiur Rahman (politician) (died 2007), Indian politician
Matiur Rahman (politician), Bangladesh Awami League politician,  Minister of Local Government, Rural Development and Co-operatives (1973–1974)